Miracle Cure is the second novel by American crime writer, Harlan Coben.  The novel was first published in 1991, and is currently out of print.

Plot summary

The plot concerns a clinic that treats people with AIDS.  Just as the scientists working there are on the brink of a breakthrough they create a cure for the disease, one of them dies.  Initially it looks like suicide but after a journalist investigates, she finds that it is murder, and there is a killer targeting the patients of the clinic as well.

Story Line 
The main story line follows the country's most telegenic couple, TV journalist Sara Lowell and New York's hottest basketball star, Michael Silverman. Their family and social connections tie them to the highest echelons of the political, medical, and sports worlds- threads that will tangle them up in one of the most controversial and deadly issues of our time. In a clinic on Manhattan's Upper West Side, a doctor has dedicated his life to eradicating a divisive and devastating disease. One by one, his patients are getting well. One by one, they're being targeted by a serial killer. And now Michael has been diagnosed with the disease. There's only one cure, but many ways to die. . . 

Novels by Harlan Coben
1991 American novels
Novels about HIV/AIDS
Novels about journalists